In linguistics, a relativizer (abbreviated )  is a type of conjunction that introduces a relative clause.  For example, in English, the conjunction that may be considered a relativizer in a sentence such as "I have one that you can use." Relativizers do not appear, at least overtly, in all languages; even in languages that do have overt or pronounced relativizers, they do not necessarily appear all of the time. For these reasons it has been suggested that in some cases, a "zero relativizer" may be present, meaning that a relativizer is implied in the grammar but is not actually realized in speech or writing. For example, the word that can be omitted in the above English example, producing "I have one you can use", using (on this analysis) a zero relativizer.

Analysis

Since as far back as 1712, people have written about relativizers and what functions they have.  They have been classified as conjunctions in earlier times, and have later been referred to as clause markers.  They are known today as relativizers. Despite an agreement in nomenclature, there are multiple analyses which attempt to account for the grammatical function and distribution of relativizers.

Promotional analysis

The promotional analysis is a transformational analysis from 1973 depicting relative clauses in English, and how relative pronouns are introduced into the embedded clause.  This analysis assumes that there is no overt head noun in the deep structure of the main clause.  In order to form a relative construction, the noun phrase from the embedded clause is promoted to the empty head of the noun phrase of the main clause.  From there, a corresponding relative pronoun leaves a trace in the space of the vacated noun phrase in the embedded clause.  For example:

Matching analysis
The Matching Analysis is another type of transformational analysis from the 1970s, which was in competition with the Promotional Analysis at that time.  In this analysis the relative pronoun is introduced into the embedded clause by corresponding or matching to the head noun in the main clause.  This is done by taking the noun phrase from the embedded sentence in the deep structure that matches the head noun in the noun phrase of the main clause, and replacing it with a relative pronoun.  The relative pronoun thus co-references the head noun in the main clause.  Finally, the relative pronoun is moved to the clause-initial position.  For example:

Ouhallian analysis

There are two separate phrasal heads that relativizers can occupy. Cross-linguistically, relativizers may occupy either the head of a complementizer phrase (C-Type Relativizer) or the head of a determiner phrase (D-Type Relativizer).  C-Type Relativizers can introduce a relative clause as an argument of a noun phrase, or they can introduce a relative clause as an argument of a verb phrase. D-Type Relativizers may only introduce a relative clause as an argument of a noun phrase. English is a language which uses a C-Type Relativizer, that, as a part of its relativization strategy because "that" can introduce a relative clause as either the argument to a Noun Phrase or the argument to a Complementizer Phrase. The following examples from English shows the same morpheme being used in both syntactic contexts.

Conversely, Arabic uses two phonologically distinct morphemes to account for these syntactic phenomena. In the same sentences in a D-Type language like Arabic, each example would employ the use of a different morpheme as shown in examples 1 & 2. In Classical and Standard Arabic, the D-Type relativizer declines according to the gender and number of the noun, but the C-Type does not do so (according to the verb).

 1) paris lli bħibba
    Paris RM I.love.it
    The Paris that I love

 2) xabbaret-na laila ʔenno l-mmaslin mʔadrabiin
    told-us laila that the-actors on.strike
    Laila told us that the actors are on strike.

In modern English

There are three types of relativizers used in English to introduce relative clauses: zero or null relativizers, wh-relativizers, and the that-relativizer.

Comparative distribution of null and overt relativizers

Relativizers have been analyzed to be optional in certain languages and are variably omitted in the English language.  Such relativizer omission, or use of the null or zero variant of relativizers, does not pattern uniformly in English and has been predicted to be conditioned and constrained by a number of linguistic and social factors.  These social factors and the potential influence of age, gender, and education have been minimally explored and seem to exhibit a lesser effect on relativizer omission.  Linguistic constraints, such as sentence structure and syntactic position of the relativizer, main clause construction type, lexical specificity of the head NP, type of antecedent, and the adjacency, length, and grammatical subject of the relative clause have been implicated as having more significant influence on the patterning of relativizer omission in Canadian English.  The omission of relativizers tends to occur more frequently in conversation than in formal writing.

Distribution with subject and object relative clauses
The syntactic position or function of the relativizer in the relative clause is a major determiner for the choice of relative marker.  The null relativizer variant is more common in object than subject relative clauses.
 3) I have friends that are moving in together.  (subject)
 4) That's one thing that I actually admire very much in my father.  (direct object)
 5) Everyone's kinda used to the age group [Ø] they work with.  (object of preposition)

Informational content of the main clause determines distribution
There is a preference for null relativizers when a main clause that is informationally light is directly adjacent to the relative clause.  For example:
 6) It's just kinda something [Ø] I noticed recently.
 7) They get values and stuff like that from church that they might not get at home.
In this example, the main clause 'it's just kinda something' provides little semantic information and it is adjacent to the relative clause 'I noticed recently'.  As such, it is thought that the main clause and the relative clause are processed together as a unitary processing chunk that is functioning like a single statement, which results in a null relativizer.

Distribution with empty head noun phrases
Empty head noun phrases, which are not lexically specific and which index generic groups or sets, have been correlated with the use of the null relativizer.  Examples of empty noun phrases include words like all, way, time, etc.
 8) All [Ø] she wants to do is sleep.
 9) She held onto all those jewelry boxes that everybody made for her when we were kids.

Unique head noun phrases, which include superlatives and nouns with the words only and first, also take the null relativizer.  For example:
 10) That's the only place [Ø] you can go at night.
 11) That's the first compliment [Ø] I've got in a long time.
 12) That was the worst job [Ø] I ever had.
 13) You have a home here that you could rent.

Length of the noun phrase determines distribution
Longer head noun phrases often co-occur with an overt relativizer, whereas shorter noun phrases are more likely to co-occur with a null relativizer.  For example:
 14) This pair of suede pants that I got.
 15) The weight [Ø] I should be at.
In these examples, the first sentence contains a longer noun phrase ('This pair of suede pants') in comparison to the second sentence, which contains a very short noun phrase ('The weight').  Thus, it is observed that the sentence containing the longer noun phrase also contains the relativizer 'that', whereas the sentence with the shorter noun phrase has a null relativizer.

Definiteness of the noun phrase determines distribution
Null relativizers have been found to be correlated to the definiteness of the nominal antecedent.  For example:
 16) I don't think you have the dedicated teacher that I had.
 17) And it was a guy [Ø] she worked with for a few years.
The first sentence contains a definite noun phrase, whereas the second sentence contains an indefinite noun phrase which co-occurs with the null relativizer.

Distribution with relative clause pronominal subjects
When the grammatical subject of a relative clause is a pronoun, it is more likely that the relativizer will be omitted.  When the subject of a relative clause is a full noun phrase, the overt relativizer will be retained.  For example:
 18) I have two cats [Ø] I'd like to turn in to the Humane Society.
 19) Do you remember exactly the road [Ø] I'm talking about?
 20) That was one of the things [Ø] he did when he was living elsewhere.
 21) I always go to my girlfriends 'cause there's stuff that your parents just don't need to know.

Distribution of overt English relativizers

The overt relativizers of Modern English include the words "which", "what", "when", "where", "who", "whom" and "whose", and these can be referred to within linguistics as "wh-words". These are officially classified as relative pronouns, but can be referred to as "wh-relativizers" in instances where their function is to introduce a relative clause.
The other overt relativizer of Modern English is the word "that", which can be referred to as the "that-relativizer" where it introduces a relative clause. There is some debate as to whether to classify it as a relative pronoun like the wh-words, a subordinating conjunction, or a complementizer. The distribution of the different types of English relativizers varies depending on several factors.

Fused relative clauses
Fused relative clauses, sometimes referred to as "free" relative clauses, are different from most other types of relative clauses in that there is no nominal antecedent to which the relative clause refers. In many cases, the relativizers of English are relative pronouns, meaning that they are in coreference with a noun that precedes them in the sentence. This nominal function is "fused" with the relative clause in free relatives, and this leaves the relativizer without an overt entity to which it can refer. For example:
 22) I wonder what inspired them
 23) I wonder whose dog died
There is no noun preceding the relative clause in these cases, and that is why it is said that this noun's function is "fused" with the relative clause.

Grammatical function of the relativized nominal determines relativizer case form
Where there are different grammatical case forms of a relativizer, the case form that surfaces will depend on the grammatical function of the noun that appears previously (known as the nominal antecedent) within the relative clause itself. The only examples in Modern English of this phenomenon are the forms "who" and "whom". "Who" surfaces when it refers to a noun that is the subject of the relative clause, and "whom" surfaces when it refers to a noun that is an object of the relative clause. However, speaker judgments vary as to whether it is grammatical for "who" to surface when it is referring to an object of the relative clause. Since, depending on speaker judgments, either only "whom" or both "who and "whom" can grammatically introduce a relative clause referring to an object, there is an "m" in brackets on the end of the relativizer in example (21) below.
 Subject antecedent
 24) The person who visited Kim
 Object antecedent
 25) The chairman listened to the student who(m) the professor gave a low grade to

Animacy of the antecedent determines distribution
Only certain relativizers can introduce clauses that refer to human antecedents, and similarly, only certain relativizers can introduce clauses that refer to non-human antecedents. "Who", "whom", and "whose" can only refer to human antecedents, "which", and "what" can only refer to non-human antecedents. "That", however, can refer to both human and non-human antecedents. To exemplify: 
 Human antecedent
 26) The Pat that I like is a genius
 27) The Pat who I like is a genius
 28) The only person that I like whose kids Dana is willing to put up with is Pat
 Non-human antecedent
 29) Every essay that she's written which I've read is on that pile
 30) Every essay which she's written that I've read is on that pile

Restrictiveness of the relative clause determines distribution
Restrictive relative clauses add extraneous information that is not vital for the listener or reader's understanding of which aforementioned noun is being referenced; or in other words, which noun is the nominal antecedent. Both wh-relativizers and the that-relativizer can be used to introduce restrictive relative clauses. Nonrestrictive relative clauses have semantic properties which make them necessary to prevent the sentence from being ambiguous. They are used in cases where the context that surrounds the sentence is not sufficient for the distinction between the potential nominal antecedents. Commas mark nonrestrictive relative clauses, and only the wh-relativizers can be used to introduce them. To exemplify:
 Restrictive sentences:
 31) He has four sons that became lawyers 
 32) The soldiers who were brave ran forward
 Nonrestrictive sentences:
 33) He has four sons, who became lawyers
 34) The soldiers, who were brave, ran forward

Finiteness of the relative clause determines distribution
In non-finite clauses (clauses in which the verb is left unconjugated), the relativizer appears as an object of preposition, or in other words, directly after a preposition in the sentence. These relative clauses appear to be introduced by the preposition itself, but they are actually introduced by both the preposition and the relativizer, since these two grammatical particles form a "prepositional phrase"; and it is this phrase that introduces the clause. For example:
 35) A yard in which to have a party
 36) The baker in whom to place your trust
 37) A student *who to talk to us just walked in
Note that (37) is ungrammatical because the relativizer introduces a non-finite relative clause, but it is not contained within a propositional phrase.

In other languages

Indonesian Teochew
Teochew is a Chinese language originating from the Chaoshan region of the eastern Guangdong Province. Indonesian Teochew refers to the Teochew dialect spoken in Indonesia. The most common way to form relative clauses in Indonesian Teochew is to use the relativizer kai. The relative clauses can appear head-finally or head-initially.

Jambi Teochew
Jambi Teochew is a variety of Indonesian Teochew that is spoken in the province of Jambi on the island of Sumatra. The language requires the use of the relativizer kai to form relative clauses. The relativizer comes from the Chinese language. The relativizer yang is optional and is borrowed from Malaysian. The relativizer kai always follows the modifying clause. If the optional relativizer yang is used, it precedes the modifying clause, as shown by example #43. If the relativizer kai is not present, the sentence becomes ungrammatical, regardless of whether yang is present or not. This is demonstrated in example #45.

 38) Aling phaʔ kai nongkiǎ khau.
      Aling hit REL child cry
      'The child that Aling hit cried.' 

 39) yang Aling phaʔ kai nongkiǎ khau.
      REL Aling hit REL child cry
      'The child that Aling hit cried.' 

 40) *Aling phaʔ nongkiǎ khau.
      Aling hit child cry
      'The child that Aling hit cried.' 

 41) *yang Aling phaʔ nongkiǎ khau.
      REL Aling hit child cry 
      'The child that Aling hit cried.' 

Another way of forming relative clauses in Jambi Teochew is by using the classifier. The main difference between the kai and classifier relative clause is that there is the presence of a classifier in the classifier relative clause. The classifier in classifier relative clauses can only appear head-initially. The classifier agrees with the head noun type and is in the place of the relativizer kai.

 42) ka Aling kai kau zin tua tsiaʔ.
       bite Aling REL dog very big CL.
       'The dog that bit Aling is a very big one.' 

 43) ka Aling tsiaʔ kau zin tua tsiaʔ.
       bite Aling CL dog very big CL. 
       'The dog that big Aling is a very big one.' 

Headless relative clauses do not have a pronounced head. It is the equivalent of "the one" in English. Headless relative clauses are formed with the relativizer kai. The Malaysian relativizer yang can be used optionally before the modifying clause.

 44) [zazik khau kai] si zi su m ui.
       yesterday cry REL COP this CL one.
       'The one who cried yesterday is this one.' 

The relativizer kai is obligatory.  In addition, it is not possible to form a headless relative clause with a classifier in the place of the relativizer kai.

 45) zi pung phou si [Aling sia kai].
       this CL book COP Aling write REL.
       'This book is the one that Aling wrote.'

 46) *zi pung phou si [Aling sia pung].
       this CL book COP Aling write CL
       'This book is the one that Aling wrote.'

Pontianak Teochew 
Pontianak Teochew is a variety of Indonesian Teochew that is spoken in the capital city of Pontianak in the province of West Kalimantan. The relativizer kai is used to form relative clauses. It is obligatory in head-final relative clauses. If kai is not present in the sentence, the sentence becomes ungrammatical, as is demonstrated by example #52. Pontianak Teochew does not allow the use of the Malaysian relativizer yang. When the relativizer is present, the sentence becomes ungrammatical, as shown in example #53.

 47) Aling phaʔ kai nongkiǎ khau.
       Aling hit REL child cry
       'The child that Aling hit cried.' 

 48) *Aling phaʔ nongkiǎ khau.
       Aling hit child cry
       'The child that Aling hit cried.' 

 49) *yang Aling phaʔ kai nongkiǎ khau.
       REL Aling hit REL child cry
       'The child that Aling hit cried.'

Ute
Ute is a language that belongs to the northern division of the Uto-Aztecan language family that spans the distance from the Rocky Mountains to Popocatepetl, south of Mexico City.

In Ute, relative clauses that modify the subject are introduced in a different manner from those that modify the object. In both cases, there is no overt relativizer morpheme, but nominalization and case morphology introduce relative clauses.

For example, nominalizing suffixes are attached to verbal elements in subject relative clauses.

 50) 'áapachi 'u [sivaatuchi 'uway paqha-puga-tu]
      boy.SU 3s.SU  goat.O    3s.O  kill-REM-NOM
      The boy who killed the goat

In relative clauses that are introduced as arguments to an object, the verbal elements are inflected with nominalizing morphology that is similar to that of their subject relative clause counterparts, and the subject of the embedded clause is inflected with the genitive case.

 51) po'oqwatu 'uru [na'achichi 'uway po'o-na]-y punikya-qha-n
       book.O    the.O girl.GEN  3s.GEN write-NOM-O see-ANT-1s
       I saw the book that the girl is writing

See also
Relative pronoun

References

Bibliography
van der Auwera, Johan (1985) "Relative That: A Centennial Dispute",  Journal of Linguistics, 21 (1), pp. 149–179. Article stable URL: https://www.jstor.org/stable/4175767.
Bohmann, Axel and Schultz, Patrick. (2011) "Sacred That and Wicked Which: Prescriptivism and Change in the Use of English Relativizers", Texas Linguistics Forum, 54, pp. 88–101.
Fox, Barbara A. and Thompson, Sandra A. (2007) "Relative Clauses in English conversation: Relativizers, frequency, and the notion of construction", Studies in Language, 31 (2), pp. 293–326(34).
Givón, T. "Ute Reference Grammar" John Benjamins Publishing Company (2011)
Johansson, Christine I. (1995) "The Relativizers `Whose' and `Of Which' in Present-Day English: Description and Theory", Dissertations Publishing, Uppsala Universitet, Sweden.
Levey, Stephen and Hill, Carolyn. (2013). "Social and Linguistic Constraints on Relativizer Omission in Canadian English", American Speech, 88 (1), pp. 32–62.
Liu, Hongyong & Gu, Yang. "Nominalization in Asian Languages: Diachronic and Typological Perspectives" Typological Studies in Language (2011): 313-343.
Ouhalla, Jamal. "Semitic Relatives." Linguistic Inquiry 35.2 (2004): 288-300. Print.
Peng, Annie. (2012) "Aspects of the Syntax of Indonesian Teochew" (Ph.D. thesis), Proquest, pp. 1–375.
Sag, Ivan A. 1997. "English relative clause constructions". Journal of linguistics. 33 (2), p. 431-483.

Syntax
Generative syntax
Parts of speech
 Grammatical marker type